The Woodlands Strykers were a collegiate summer baseball team based in The Woodlands, Texas,  north of Houston, Texas, in the United States. The Strykers were owned by Ramiro Lozano, and were members of the Texas Collegiate League from 2012 to 2016. They played their home games at Strykers Stadium at The Woodlands Christian Academy.

History
In January 2012, Ramiro Lozano, bought a baseball franchise and unveiled them as the Woodlands Strykers. The team consisted of 30 players from American colleges, including 20 from the team's local Houston, Texas, area. 

The Strykers played 60 games in their inaugural season against six other teams in the Texas Collegiate League, including 30 home games at The Woodlands Christian Academy in the season that began on June 1, 2012. They played against teams from Bryan, Dallas, Kilgore, and Victoria in Texas, as well as Youngsville, Louisiana. At the end of the season, outfielder Michael Aquino was named the 2012 Texas Collegiate League Player of the Year.

In 2014, Woodlands players Cody Clarke, Andrew Godail, Nolan Holland, Spencer Rahm, Kevin Santana, Gandy Stubblefield, and Mark Whitehead were chosen as Texas Collegiate League All-Stars.

John Villarreal was the head coach for the Strykers. 

The team disbanded in 2016.

Season-by-season results

References

2012 establishments in Texas
2016 disestablishments in Texas
Amateur baseball teams in Texas
Baseball teams established in 2012
Baseball teams disestablished in 2016
Defunct baseball teams in Texas
Texas Collegiate League teams
The Woodlands, Texas